Xyroptila fulbae is a moth of the family Pterophoridae. It is found in North-Western State, Nigeria.

References

External links

Moths described in 2006
Endemic fauna of Nigeria
Moths of Africa
fulbae